Saving Abel is the debut studio album by American rock band Saving Abel. It was released on March 11, 2008 and produced by Skidd Mills, producer of their independently released album of the same name.

The album peaked at number 49 on the Billboard 200, and was certified Gold by the RIAA on March 6, 2009.

Singles
The first single off the album is "Addicted" which has received airplay across the country. It has reached number 20 on the Billboard Hot 100. It sold over 800,000 copies in the US alone.

The second single, "18 Days", reached number 6 on the Hot Mainstream Rock Tracks chart.

"Drowning (Face Down)" became their third single and received airplay across the country.

Critical reception
The reviews that Saving Abel received have been generally positive. Only Rock had given the album 3 and 1/2 stars, while AllMusic gave the album 2 and 1/2 stars. AbsolutePunk gave the album a rating of 90% rating, and in another very positive review, Tunelab Music gave the album a rating of 9 out of 10 stars.

Track listing

B-sides
 "Goodbye" – 4:07 ("Goodbye" is also on the 18 Days Tour EP)
 "After All" – 3:16 ("After All" is also on NCIS soundtrack)

Personnel
Saving Abel
 Jared Weeks – lead vocals
 Jason Null – lead guitar
 Scott Bartlett – rhythm guitar, backing vocals
 Eric Taylor – bass
 Blake Dixon – drums

Production
 Skidd Mills – producer and mixing
 Brad Blackwood – mastering

Charts

Weekly charts

Year-end charts

References

2008 debut albums
Saving Abel albums
Virgin Records albums